Hemigomphus is a genus of dragonflies in the family Gomphidae, 
endemic to Australia.
The species are small with black and yellow markings. They are commonly known as vicetails.

Species
The genus Hemigomphus includes the following species:

Hemigomphus atratus  - black vicetail
Hemigomphus comitatus  - zebra vicetail
Hemigomphus cooloola  - Wallum vicetail
Hemigomphus gouldii  - southern vicetail
Hemigomphus heteroclytus  - stout vicetail
Hemigomphus magela  - Kakadu vicetail
Hemigomphus theischingeri  - rainforest vicetail

See also
 List of Odonata species of Australia

References

Gomphidae
Anisoptera genera
Odonata of Australia
Endemic fauna of Australia
Taxa named by Edmond de Sélys Longchamps